
Jasło County is a unit of territorial administration and local government (powiat) in Subcarpathian Voivodeship, south-eastern Poland, on the Slovak border. It came into being on January 1, 1999, as a result of the Polish local government reforms passed in 1998.

As of 2019 its total population was 113,730, out of which the population of Jasło was 35,063,  that of Jasło was 1,409, and the rural population was 77,258.

Neighbouring counties
Jasło County is bordered by Gorlice County to the west, Tarnów County to the north-west, Dębica County to the north, Strzyżów County to the north-east and Krosno County to the east. It also borders Slovakia to the south.

Administrative division
The county is subdivided into 10 gminas (one urban, one urban-rural and eight rural). These are listed in the following table, in descending order of population.

References

 
Land counties of Podkarpackie Voivodeship